Le Vieux-Longueuil is a borough in the city of Longueuil.

From 2002 to 2006, Le Vieux-Longueuil borough stood for what used to be the city of Longueuil from 1969 to 2002. The former city of Longueuil was composed of 3 cities merged in the 1960s: Ville Jacques-Cartier, Montréal-Sud and Longueuil.

Since 2006, Le Vieux-Longueuil borough stands for the combination of the former city of Longueuil and LeMoyne. LeMoyne joined Le Vieux-Longueuil borough when Saint-Lambert left the city of Longueuil in 2006.

Canada Post uses "Longueuil" only on addresses that are located within the former city of Longueuil. As such, many people continue to associate the name Longueuil to the former city rather than the current city. The former city of Longueuil has a neighbourhood which is also called Vieux-Longueuil.

Le Vieux-Longueuil borough has 9 municipal districts. One of the districts contains LeMoyne and a portion of the former city of Longueuil. The other 8 districts are all located in the former city of Longueuil.

Neighbourhoods
Old Longueuil
LeMoyne
Notre-Dame
Saint-Jean-Vianney
Saint-Vincent-de-Paul
Sacré-Coeur
Carillon / Saint-Pie-X
Saint-Robert
Fatima

Demographics

Note: Includes combined results of the former cities of Longueuil and Lemoyne.

Education

Primary
 Ecole Primaire Adrien-Gamache
 Ecole Primaire Armand-Racicot
 Ecole Primaire Bel-Essor
 Ecole Primaire Bourgeoys-Champagnat
 Ecole Primaire Carillon
 Ecole Primaire Christ-Roi
 Ecole Primaire de Normandie
 Ecole Primaire du Curé-Lequin
 Ecole Primaire du Tournesol
 Ecole Primaire Félix-Leclerc
 Ecole Primaire Gentilly
 Ecole Primaire Gentilly (Boisé des Lutins)
 Ecole Primaire George-Étienne-Cartier
 Ecole Primaire Hubert-Perron
 Ecole Primaire Jacques-Ouellette
 Ecole Primaire Jean-De Lalande
 Ecole Primaire Joseph-de Sérigny
 Ecole Primaire Lajeunesse *
 Ecole Primaire le Déclic
 Ecole Primaire les Petits-Castors
 Ecole Primaire Lionel-Groulx
 Ecole Primaire Marie-Victorin (Longueuil) Pavillon le Jardin
 Ecole Primaire Marie-Victorin (Longueuil) Pavillon l'Herbier
 Ecole Primaire Paul-De Maricourt
 Ecole Primaire Pierre-D'Iberville
 Ecole Primaire Plein-Soleil
 Ecole Primaire Sainte-Claire
 Ecole Primaire Saint-Jude
 Ecole Primaire Saint-Romain
 Ecole Primaire Samuel-de Champlain (Longueuil)
 St. Mary's Elementary

Secondary
 Collège Charles-Lemoyne (Longueuil Campus)
 Collège Français
 Collège Notre-Dame-de-Lourdes
 École Secondaire Gérard-Filion
 École Secondaire Gérard-Filion (Pavillon Bois-Joly)
 École Secondaire Gérard-Filion Le BAC (secondaire spécial)
 École Secondaire Hélène-De Champlain (Longueuil)
 École Secondaire Jacques-Ouellette
 École Secondaire Jacques-Rousseau
 École Secondaire Notre-Dame
 École Secondaire Saint-Jean-Baptiste

Adult Education
 Centre d'apprentissage personnalisé le Cap
 CEA LeMoyne-D'Iberville

Higher Education
 Université de Sherbrooke (Longueuil Campus)
 Collège Édouard-Montpetit CEGEP
 Centre de formation professionnelle Gérard-Filion
 Centre de formation professionnelle Jacques-Rousseau
 Centre de formation professionnelle Pierre-Dupuy

 The primary school Lajeunesse is located in LeMoyne. All other educational institutions listed above are in the former city of Longueuil.

References

See also
 Municipal reorganization in Quebec
Old Longueuil

Boroughs of Longueuil
Populated places established in 2002
2002 establishments in Quebec